The former Hôtel de Chevreuse (later known as the Hôtel de Luynes) was a Parisian hôtel particulier located at 33 Rue Saint-Dominique (on a site that now includes part of the Boulevard Saint-Germain), just south of the Église Saint-Thomas-d'Aquin.

History
The Hôtel de Chevreuse was constructed in 1660 for Marie de Rohan, Duchess of Chevreuse, by the architect Pierre Le Muet, whose designs were engraved by Jean Marot and published in the Grand Marot in 1686. Le Muet's hôtel was in the traditional French style, between court and garden.

In 1670, the granddaughter of Marie de Rohan, Jeanne Baptiste d'Albert, was born at the Hôtel de Chevreuse. Upon Marie de Rohan's death in 1679, the house passed to Jeanne-Baptiste's father, Louis Charles d'Albert, Duke of Luynes, Marie de Rohan's son from her first marriage.

In 1747 the Italian painter Paolo Antonio Brunetti decorated the grand staircase with wall paintings depicting figures in a simulated architecture. These paintings can still be viewed in the Luynes Staircase at the Musée Carnavalet.

The apartment of Charles Louis d'Albert de Luynes, Duke of Chevreuse and Governor of Paris, was remodeled in 1767 by Pierre-Louis Moreau-Desproux. His boiserie and fireplace from the former chambre de parade of the Duke of Chevreuse was bequeathed in 1962 to the Musée du Louvre by the widow of the French industrialist  and was refurbished and reinstalled in the Department of Decorative Arts in 2013.

The hôtel was partly destroyed in 1868, during the creation of the Boulevard Saint-Germain. The remaining sections were demolished in 1900 to make way for the Rue de Luynes and the Boulevard Raspail.

Image gallery

Notes

Bibliography
 Benezit (2006). Benezit Dictionary of Artists. Paris: Gründ. . Also at Oxford Art Online.
 Deutsch, Kristina (2015). Jean Marot : Un graveur d'architecture à l'époque de Louis XIV. Berlin: De Gruyter. .
 Gady, Alexandre (2012). "Boiseries Voyageuses". Tribune des Amis du Louvre.
 Mignot, Claude (1996). "Le Muet, Pierre", vol. 19, pp. 144–146, in  The Dictionary of Art, 34 volumes, edited by Jane Turner, reprinted with minor corrections in 1998. New York: Grove. . Also at Oxford Art Online.
 Sellier, Charles (1900). L'Hôtel de Chevreuse ou de Luynes. Saint-Denis: Imprimerie H. Bouillant. Copy at Google Books.

External links

 "Boiseries Voyageuses" by Alexandre Gady, 2012
 "Les Amis du Louvre - Chambre du Duc de Chevreuse" @ vimeo.com

Chevreuse
Buildings and structures in the 7th arrondissement of Paris
Houses completed in 1660
Ancien Régime French architecture
Demolished buildings and structures in Paris
Former buildings and structures in Paris
1660 establishments in France
Buildings and structures demolished in 1868
Buildings and structures demolished in 1900